Leptophyes albovittata is a species belonging to the family Tettigoniidae  subfamily Phaneropterinae. It is found in Europe east of France and Spain. mainly in Eastern Europe . To the west, the border runs along the line Würzburg-Nördlingen-Munich. The species feeds on delicate and soft-leaved plants, such as chickweed, dandelion and Lathyrus.

References

Orthoptera of Europe
Insects described in 1833
Phaneropterinae